Gallinara or Isola d'Albenga is a small private island that lies in the Ligurian Sea off the coast of Albenga in the Province of Savona, Liguria, northern Italy. It is known for its unique shape, resembling a turtle.

Etymology
the name comes from “galline” (Italian for wild hens) as they used to populate the island

History 
On the island, then called Gallinara, Martin, destined to become Saint Martin of Tours, decided in his youth  to seek shelter and live the solitary life of a hermit, before he joined Hilary of Poitiers in Gaul. The wreck of a Roman ship has been found in the waters of its coast. It was owned by the church until 1842. During World War II the island was occupied by German soldiers. In 2020 the island was planned to be bought by Ukrainian businessman Olexandr Boguslayev for 25 million euros, with criticism by politicians and locals, as the island is considered a heritage site by many. although the island reverted to being public.

Nature conservation 

The island is now protected as the Riserva Naturale Regionale Isola Gallinara, a shelter for the herring gull, with one of the largest colonies of this bird in the Mediterranean, and for rare plant species and stretches of intact shallow sea floor.
It is also included in a SIC (Site of Community Importance) called Isola Gallinara (code  IT1324908 ).

See also 
 List of islands of Italy

References

Islands of Liguria
Ligurian Sea
Natura 2000 in Italy
Private islands of Italy